Siljan is the name of:
Siljan, Norway, a municipality in Norway
Siljan (lake), a lake in Sweden